Chhatarpur is a city and a municipality in Chhatarpur district in the state of Madhya Pradesh, India. It is the administrative headquarters of Chhatarpur District. Chhatarpur is a city and a municipality in Chhatarpur district in the state of Madhya Pradesh, India. It is the administrative headquarters of Chhatarpur District.

History

Chhatarpur was founded in 1785 and is named after leader Chhatrasal, the founder of Bundelkhand, and contains his cenotaph. The state was ruled by his descendants until 1785. At that time the Ponwar clan of the Rajputs took control of Chhatarpur.  The state was guaranteed to Kunwar Sone Singh Ponwar in 1806 by the British Raj.
In 1854 Chhatarpur would have lapsed to the British government for want of direct heirs under the doctrine of lapse, but was conferred on Jagat Raj as a special act of grace.

In 1901 the town of Chhatarpur had a population of 10,029, a high school and manufactured paper and coarse cutlery. The state also contained the British cantonment of Nowgong.

Rajas

1785–1816 Kunwar Sone Shah (d. 1816)
1816–1854 Partab Singh (d. 1854)
1854–1867 Jaghat Singh (b. 1846 – d. 1867)
1867–1895 Vishvanath Singh (b. 1866 – d. 1932)

Maharajas

 (4 May 1649 – 20 December 1731) Maharaja Chhatrasal
 1895–1932 Vishvanath Singh (b. 1866 – d. 1932)
 1932–1947 Bhawani Singh (b. 1921 – d. 2006)

After the independence of India in 1947, the Rajas of Chhatarpur acceded to India, and Chhatarpur, together with the rest of Bundelkhand, became part of the Indian state of Vindhya Pradesh.  Vindhya Pradesh was later merged into the state of Madhya Pradesh in 1956.

Geography
It has an average elevation of 305 metres (1,000 feet).
It is located on the far north-east border of Madhya Pradesh.It is 133 km from Jhansi in Uttar Pradesh and 233 km from Gwalior in Madhya Pradesh.

Places to Visit
Chhatarpur Railway station(MCSC) is the nearest station to reach Bageshwar Dham Sarkar .

Climate
Chhatarpur has humid subtropical climate (Köppen climate classification Cwa) with hot summers, a somewhat cooler monsoon season and cool winters. Heavy rainfall occurs in the monsoon season from June to September.

Demographics
 India census, Chhatarpur had a population of 99 519. Males constitute 53% of the population and females 47%. Chhatarpur has an average literacy rate of 69%: with male literacy of 75% and female literacy of 62%. 15% of the population is under 6 years of age.

Economy
There is no large scale industry in Chhatarpur apart from a few small scale industries available, but these industries are not sufficient for giving enough employment to local people. The economy is mostly dependent on farming. The city however, has a growing private commercial sector, mainly retail businesses. There are many granite mining industries operating in Chhatarpur district.

Most depend for their livelihood on farming. This region is in a drought-affected area, so the whole district faces a water crisis for farming and potable drinking water.

Administration
Chhatarpur Police is a Law enforcing unit of MP Police which protects the world heritage "Khajuraho Group of Monuments". The district is divided into 5 police subdivisions, with 34 Police Stations and 21 outposts.

Education
India's largest chain schooling Kendriya Vidyalaya Chhatarpur is situated at Mahoba Road near RTO office

Most of the colleges in Chhatarpur district are affiliated to Maharaja Chhatrasal Bundelkhand University, Chhatarpur. They offer graduate and post-graduate courses in the faculties of Arts, Science, Commerce, Education and Law. Government Maharaja P.G. College, Government Girls P.G. College and Digital Institute of Science & Technology are the premier institutions of graduate and post-graduate education in the city. Christian English College is the only CISCE- affiliated school of the city. Swami Pranawanand Homeopathic Medical College is affiliated to Madhya Pradesh Medical Science University, Jabalpur.

Transportation
Chhatarpur can be reached by road and railway. Chhatarpur station started in 2017. Chhatarpur has railway station named Maharaja chhatrasal station Chhatarpur, MCSC. There are direct trains to Delhi Jhansi, Bhopal, Indore, and Ujjain. The nearest railway stations are at Khajuraho (45 km), Lalitpur Junction railway station (135 km) Harpalpur (55 km) Jhansi (125 km), Mauranipur (65 km) and Satna (140 km). The nearest airport is Khajuraho Civil Aerodrome, located 45 km away but has limited number of flights. The nearest major airport with flights to Delhi, Mumbai and Kolkata is Kanpur Airport 190 km away.

Radio and television station
Chhatarpur has got its own radio station of All India Radio (आकाशवाणी) under Prasar Bharati. It transmits at 675 kHz. Chhatarpur also has a Doordarshan's Hi power transmitter for TV which is located at Deri Road.

Tourism
 Ancient holy Temple Ma Manshapurn Mandir Bijawar 
 Khajuraho, group of monuments is a group of Hindu temples and Jain temples
 Khajwa Kutni Dam, Kutni dam is the largest dam in Chhatarpur district.
 Kutni Island Resort (Khajwa)
 Jatashankar, a holy place near Bijawar.
 Bhimkund, a natural water tank and a holy place near Bajna
 Gangau dam, a huge structure built at the confluence of two rivers, namely the Simiri River and Ken River (a prominent river of Bundelkhand), near Khajuraho, around 18 km away.
 Raneh Falls, the only waterfall in Asia having igneous rock.  It is around 17 km from Khajuraho
 Hanuman Tauria, a Hanuman temple
 Bambar Baini, Ancient temple of maa Durga on a hill in Lavkushnagar
 Panna National Park, near Panna district
 Pandav Falls, close to Khajuraho, Pandavas said to have sought shelter here during exile
 Hanuman Mandir, temple of Hanuman on a hill in Lavkushnagar
 Prannath Mandir Panna,  from Chhatarpur
 Kishor Ji Temple,  from Chhatarpur
 Maa Shavri Temple [Maharajpur]
 Kali Mata Temple [Maharajpur]
 Maa Baghrajan Temple [Maharajpur]

References

Bibliography
 J. R. Ackerley, Hindoo Holiday, NYRB Classics,

External links

 Chhatarpur official website by MP Govt.

 
Cities and towns in Chhatarpur district
Cities in Bundelkhand
Cities in Madhya Pradesh